Francis Xavier Yu Soo-il, O.F.M. Obs. (born March 23, 1945) is a Korean prelate of the Roman Catholic Church.
He served as head of the Military Ordinariate of Korea from 2010 to 2021.

References

1945 births

Living people
Observant Franciscan bishops
People from Nonsan